"Danger" is a 1983 single by The Flirts, a New York-based female vocal trio created by producer/songwriter Bobby Orlando.

Composition 
The song was written and produced by Bobby Orlando.

Charts

References 

1983 songs
1983 singles
The Flirts songs
Songs written by Bobby Orlando
Song recordings produced by Bobby Orlando